Sahel Oulad H'Riz is a small town and rural commune in Berrechid Province of the Casablanca-Settat region of Morocco. In the 2014 Moroccan census the commune recorded a population of 38,156 people living in 7250 households. At the time of the 2004 census, the commune had a total population of 26,435 people living in 4,654 households.

References

Populated places in Berrechid Province
Rural communes of Casablanca-Settat